Mesta is a Greek traditional village on the island of Chios. It belongs to the Mastic Villages, a group of villages in South Chios where the main activity is the manufacture of mastic. The mastic villages have been added to the representative List of the Intangible Cultural Heritage of Humanity of UNESCO. Mesta is characterised by particular architecture since it is a village-castle with perfectly preserved medieval architecture. Mesta is located 35 km south west of Chios (town), 4 km away from the coast. It is built at a height of 120m and it belongs to Chios municipality and Mastichochoria municipal unit. It is also a community that comprises the village Limenas where the port of south west Chios is located.

History
The village was probably built in the 12th century during the Byzantine era. The architecture of the settlement with its narrow streets and perimetric fortification served to repel pirate raids. The street plan of the village is pentagonical and its many narrow roads inside the fortifications give the impression of a labyrinth. The fortifications were reinforced during the Genoese era in Chios, between 1346 and 1566. The church of the Older Taxiarchi that is located in the centre of the village was built in 1794. A lot of villagers of Mesta were killed or captured during the Chios massacre. Some of them were released after a while because the mastic agriculture was important for the Ottomans.

Historical population

Gallery

References

Populated places in Chios